The South-Western Front electoral district was a constituency created for the 1917 Russian Constituent Assembly election. The electoral district covered the South-Western Front of the Russian Army.

Results

References

Electoral districts of the Russian Constituent Assembly election, 1917
1910s elections in Ukraine